Jaswal Pani is a village in Abbottabad District of Khyber Pakhtunkhwa province of Pakistan. It is located at 34°4'50N 73°6'30E with an altitude of 1412 metres (4635 feet).

References

Populated places in Abbottabad District